The TOS-2 (Tosochka) (Heavy Flamethrower System) is a Soviet multiple rocket launcher capable of using thermobaric warheads, mounted on a 3-axle truck chassis. TOS-2 was designed to attack enemy fortified positions and lightly armoured vehicles and transports, in open terrain in particular.

History

On 12 January 2018, it was announced that NPO Splav was working on a prototype of a next generation TOS-1 system for preliminary tests. The system with improved tactical and technical characteristics will be made on a wheeled chassis.

The new TOS-2 (Tosochka) system was first unveiled during the 2020 Moscow Victory Day Parade, and further showcased during the Kavkaz-2020 drills in September 2020. It is equipped with a more powerful TBS-M3 rocket and its own crane. It has also an increased range and is protected from precision weapons. The system uses the 6x6 Ural-63706-0120 all-terrain vehicle instead of the tracked armored chassis of the TOS-1A.

The TOS-2 entered service with the Central Military District of Russia on 6 January 2021.

In late May 2022, TASS reported that the system was deployed in Ukraine during the 2022 Russian invasion of Ukraine.

Munitions

The original rocket for the TOS-1A had a range of only . Modernized systems with active protection, new engine and launchers and other improvements were delivered in early 2018.
The system was modernized in 2016.
 The M0.1.01.04M2 rocket was upgraded in March 2020 to a heavier thermobaric warhead and better 10km range, to operate outside the range of modern ATGMs.

References

Modern thermobaric weapons of Russia
Multiple rocket launchers
Self-propelled artillery of Russia
Wheeled self-propelled rocket launchers
Military vehicles introduced in the 2020s